Willie's Magic Wand is a 1907 British short  silent comedy film, directed by Walter R. Booth, featuring a young boy terrorising the household with his father's magic wand. Similar to "earlier trick films The Haunted Curiosity Shop and Undressing Extraordinary (both 1901)," this is, according to Michael Brooke of BFI Screenonline, "essentially a series of [loosely linked] special-effects set pieces," however, "the print in the National Film and Television Archive is incomplete, omitting amongst other things a come-uppance where Willie is punished for his misdemeanours by being turned into a girl, thus depriving him of more than one magic wand." A clip from the film is featured in Paul Merton's interactive guide to early British silent comedy How They Laughed on the BFI website.

References

External links

British black-and-white films
British silent short films
1907 comedy films
1907 films
1907 short films
Articles containing video clips
British comedy short films
Films directed by Walter R. Booth
Films about magic and magicians
Silent comedy films